The 1996 UEFA Futsal Championship was the first official edition of the UEFA-governed European Championship for national futsal teams. It was held in Spain, between January 8 and January 14, 1996, in one venue located in the city of Córdoba.

Qualification

Qualified teams

Venue

Squads

Group stage

Group A

Group B

Knockout stage

Semi-finals

Fifth-place play-off

Third-place play-off

Final

External links
 UEFA.com

 
UEFA
1996
International futsal competitions hosted by Spain
1995–96 in Spanish futsal
Sport in Córdoba, Spain
UEFA Futsal Championship